Kepler-34b (formally Kepler-34(AB)b) is a circumbinary planet announced with Kepler-35b. It is a small gas giant that orbits every ~288 days around two stars. Despite the planet's relatively long orbital period, its existence could be confirmed quickly due to transiting both of its host stars.

The Kepler-34b is unlikely to form at the current orbit, and likely migrated early from birth orbit beyond 1.5 AU away from parent binary stars, suffering multiple giant impacts in the process. The eccentricity of planetary orbit may be acquired on the last stage of migration, due to interaction with the residual debris disk, or by ejection of the second planet.

References

Exoplanets discovered in 2011
34b
Transiting exoplanets
Circumbinary planets

Cygnus (constellation)